Fishlabs GmbH (formerly Fishlabs Entertainment GmbH and Deep Silver Fishlabs) is a German video game developer based in Hamburg. Founded in 2004 by Michael Schade and Christian Lohr, the studio is best known for its Galaxy on Fire series. Following a brief bankruptcy proceeding, Fishlabs was acquired by Koch Media and reorganised as part of their game publishing label Deep Silver.

History 
Fishlabs was founded in 2004 by Michael Schade and Christian Lohr, incorporated under the name Fishlabs Entertainment GmbH. That same year, the company received a round of financing, which allowed them to pay for development expenses for several years while generating revenue from their releases. The company had also planned a series B round in May 2010, as they announced that would be moving into the massively multiplayer online games market. By mid-2013, Fishlabs had run out of money; in October, 25 jobs were cut before the company went into self-administration. On 2 December, media company Koch Media announced that they had acquired Fishlabs, which would henceforth operate as the dedicated mobile studio for their game publishing label, Deep Silver. As the agreement was an asset deal, all of Fishlab's assets, including 52 employees, were transferred to Koch Media and incorporated in a new division of that company, called Deep Silver Fishlabs. The company's former legal entity, Fishlabs Entertainment GmbH, was to be dissolved, and both founders left the company. Schade and Lohr founded Rockfish Games in 2014 and developed Everspace. As result of the change in ownership, and the associated financial stability, Fishlabs also moved into video game publishing.

Fishlabs employed 67 people in August 2019, and 80 in January 2020.

List of video games

Notes

References

External links 
 

German companies established in 2004
Companies based in Hamburg
Deep Silver
Video game companies established in 2004
Video game companies of Germany
Video game publishers
Video game development companies
2013 mergers and acquisitions